Fazal Pookoya Thangal ( سيّدفضل بوكوي; Yemen, c.1820 - Turkey, 1901), known as Sayyid Fadl and Fadl Pasha, was a Yemeni Islamic missionary and political activist in Kerala.

Birth and childhood
Fazal Pookoya Thangal was born in the 1820s, the son of Sayyid Alavi Thangal, a Muslim mystical and political leader, and Fathima Beevi, the daughter of Aboobacker Madani, a Muslim mystic. He spent his childhood studying under his father.

Thangal first learnt from one of his father's personal assistants, Alhaji Chalilakath Kuday, then from Parapanangadi Aboobacker Koya Musliyar, Baithan Musliyar Velliyangod Umar Khazi, Moideen Khazi, Calicut Khazi, Zainudeen Musliyar Thirurangadi and Sheikh Sayyid Abdulla Bin Umar. He studied hadith, fiqh, and languages.

Thangal went to Mecca to study after the death of his father in 1845, and returned to Kerala in 1848.

Rebellions

In sermons he spoke about current conditions of Malabar's people. He taught both Islam and the need to oppose British rule. The British duly investigated him.

Manjeri revolt

In August 1849 there was another revolt at Manjeri (location of a revolt in 1844).

Kulathur revolt
 William Logan recorded three serious incidents of revolt suppressed by British forces between 1849 and 1852 in his Malabar Manual.

Exile from Malabar

The British discussed expelling Thangal after the release of the T. L. Strange commission investigation report, but district collector H.V. Conolly wanted to exile him only from Malabar. As it happened, he was exiled to Arabia.

The Mappila killed Conolly.

Writings
Thangal's works include:
Uddathul Umara' Val Hukkam Li Ihanathil Kafarah va Abadathil Asnam (عدة الامراء و الحكام لاهانة الكفرة و عبدة الاصنام)
Hulalul Ehsan Fee Thsyeenul Insane ( حلال الاحسان في تحسين الانسان)
Asasul Islam fee Bayani Ahkem (اساس الاسلام في بيان الاحكام)
Bavarikul Fathyana: lee Thaqviyathul Bihyana (بوارك الفتيان لتقوية البنتيان)
Risalathul Muslim Ila Habir lee Edrakul Gabir (رسالة المسلمين للحابر يدروغ الكبير)
 ishafful Shafeeque fee Bayarakkelk (اشعاف شفيق في بيارك)
Athareekul Hanafiy (التاريخ الحنفية)
Thadheerul Hqyar Aquar Min Rukubil Hari Vannur (تظهير الحقيار من رقوب الحاري و النور )
Vadhathul Umrah Val Hokum lee Ehanthil Kashrathi Vahabyathul Hayan (وحدة العمرة و الحكوم ل للاعانة الكفرة) وعبودية العصيان)
 Edhah Ul Asrar (اظهار الاسرار)
Al Fuyathul Elahin

See also
Mappila riots#Riot inciters

References

1820s births
1901 deaths
Islam in Kerala
Mappilas
19th-century Indian Muslims
Riots and civil disorder in India
Manjeri